The western bristlebird (Dasyornis longirostris) is a species of bird in the family Dasyornithidae.
It is endemic to the coastal heaths of western Australia (east and west of Albany).

Description 
Adults are 18–22 cm long. Its plumage is grey-brown. It has a shorter tail than other bristlebirds, yet it is still quite long tail is rufous, with darker brown stripes. Its body is rufous with dark brown under-surface feathers, giving it a scalloped look. It has a red eye, and the front of neck and face is off-white.

Its natural habitat is temperate shrubland.
It is threatened by habitat loss.

References

External links
BirdLife Species Factsheet.

western bristlebird
Endemic birds of Western Australia
western bristlebird
Taxonomy articles created by Polbot